James Corrigan (17 October 1867 – 28 February 1929), was an American actor. He appeared in 16 films between 1920 and 1927.

He was born in Dayton, Ohio, and died in Los Angeles, California.

Married to actress Lillian Elliott, Corrigan was the father of actor Lloyd Corrigan.

Filmography

References

External links

James Corrigan with Mary Carr and Norma Shearer in Slave of Fashion (1925)

1867 births
1929 deaths
American male film actors
American male silent film actors
20th-century American male actors
Male actors from Dayton, Ohio